Taehŭng station is a railway station in Taehŭng 1-dong, greater Tanch'ŏn city, South Hamgyŏng province, North Korea, on the Kŭmgol Line of the Korean State Railway. It was opened sometime after 1988 along with the rest of the Kŭmgol–Muhak section of the line.

References

Railway stations in North Korea